Muhammed Egemen Pehlivan (born 11 January 2000) is a Turkish professional footballer who plays as a midfielder for TFF Third League club Sapanca Gençlikspor on loan from Fatih Karagümrük.

Career
Pehlivan is a youth product of İstanbul Gençlerbirliği, Kasımpaşa and Fatih Karagümrük. He signed his first professional contract with Fatih Karagümrük in the summer of 2020 for 5 years, and in his debut season helped them earn promotion into the Süper Lig. He made his professional and Süper Lig debut with Fatih Karagümrük in a 2-0  loss to Alanyaspor on 25 October 2020. He joined Bayrampaşaspor on loan for the 2021-22 season where he made 13 appearances. The following season 2022-23, he joined Sapanca Gençlikspor on loan in the TFF Third League.

References

External links

2000 births
People from Gaziosmanpaşa
Living people
Turkish footballers
Association football midfielders
Fatih Karagümrük S.K. footballers
Bayrampaşaspor footballers
Süper Lig players
TFF First League players
TFF Third League players